Hrastje pri Mirni Peči is a small settlement in the Municipality of Mirna Peč in southeastern Slovenia. The area is part of the traditional region of Lower Carniola and is now included in the Southeast Slovenia Statistical Region.

Name
The name of the settlement was changed from Hrastje to Hrastje pri Mirni Peči (literally, 'Hrastje near Mirna Peč') in 1953. The name Hrastje is derived from the Slovene common noun hrast 'oak', referring to the local vegetation.

References

External links
Hrastje pri Mirni Peči on Geopedia

Populated places in the Municipality of Mirna Peč